Tabernaemontana chocoensis is a species of plant in the family Apocynaceae. It is found in Colombia.

References

chocoensis